InkBall is a computer game that is included with Windows XP Tablet PC Edition 2005 and Windows Vista except the Starter and Home Basic editions.  It employs the use of a stylus or mouse to draw lines to direct balls into holes of corresponding colors. On Windows XP Tablet PC Edition, a pen tablet was required to play the game properly, as the mouse cursor was not visible inside the game window. However, pressing Alt twice while playing the game will cause the mouse cursor to show up. In Windows Vista, it can also be played using the mouse without any issues.
InkBall is not available for later versions of Windows, and is removed when users upgrade from Windows XP or Vista to Windows 7.

Points are awarded for putting colored balls in the correct hole, time left at the end of the round, and for breaking blocks. The game is over when time runs out, or when a ball enters a hole of the wrong color. However, gray is a neutral color and therefore if a gray ball goes into the hole of a different color or if any ball goes into a gray hole nothing will happen. Some blocks have special properties, such as breaking when hit, opening and closing at intervals, changing the ball's color or making the ball accelerate. InkBall has a variety of difficulty levels, ranging from Beginner, to Novice, to Intermediate, to Advanced and finally to Expert. As the difficulty increases, the time to move the balls into their correct hole(s) is dramatically lowered, and the overall complexity of the task increases substantially.

See also
 List of games included with Windows

References

External links
Windows XP Tablet PC Edition 2005: Tools to Use with Your Tablet PC

2004 video games
Discontinued Windows components
Microsoft games
Puzzle video games
Video games developed in the United States
Windows games
Windows-only games